John Brown (3 March 1723 - 16 January 1808) was a Scottish-Danish merchant and ship-owner. He was a joint founder of John & David Brown in 1759. The company owned 17 ships in 1787 but was liquidated the following year. He was also active in the Danish Asiatic Company where he was a member of the board of directors from 1770–75 and from 1779–85. He was appointed as General War Commissioner in 1776. He was the second-largest landowner in Gentofte and owned Benzonseje (now Risbyholm) from 1784 to 1788.

Early life
Brown was born on 3 March 1723 in Dalkeith, Scotland, the son of William Brown and Margeret Brown. He  came to Denmark a few months after his father had been killed in the Battle of Culloden.

Career
Brown was initially employed in Nicolai Fenwich's trading house in Helsingør. He moved to Copenhagen in 1750 to work as a general trader. In 1755, he was granted citizenship as a merchant. He purchased a property at Christianshavns Kanal, close to Snorrebroen, where he established a coal storage depot and warehouse. From 1757 his office was in Vingårfsstræde. In 1759, John and his brother David established a trading house, John & David Brown, which mainly traded in wine, bituminous coal and materials for the clothing industry. Their ships mainly traded in the Danish West Indies and the Mediterranean, but later also in Danish India. In 1787, John & David Brown had a fleet of 17 merchant ships.

In the late 1750s, Brown became a major stakeholder in the Danish Asiatic Company. He was a member of the board of directors in 1770–75 and again in 1779–85. From 1884, he also began to trade in Danish India with his own ships, especially after his brother was appointed as Lord Governor of Tranquebar.

In 1781, he acquired the dockyard of Unrost at Frederick's German Church in Christianshavn for his eldest son William. William was the next year made a partner in his father's trading house, which from then on traded as  John & William Brown & Co. The company went bankrupt in 1788.

Ships

Property
Brown was interested in agriculture. He was the second-largest landowner in Gentofte (after Count Johann Hartwig Ernst von Bernstorff). He was the owner of Tranegård with the brickyard Maglegård and Getreuensand. He imported Scottish farmers to improve the management of the land.

In 1782, he purchased the Barchmann Mansion at the corner of Frederiksholms Kanal and Ny Kongensgade in Copenhagen. He also acquired the manor of Benzonseje (Risbyholm). The estate included six churches. In difficult times he sold Benzonseje to his estate administrator of Benzonseje an later chamber councilor "kammerråd" and agricultural commissioner Lars Lassen in 1789.

Personal life
 
He married Anna Appleby (1738-1798) on 20 October 1756 in the German Reformed Church in Copenhagen. She was the daughter of Peter Applebye and Anna Pattridge.

 
Brown was a member of the Royal Copenhagen Shooting Society. He spent his last years at Maglegård where he had constructed a new main building. The estate was owned by one of his daughters. He died on the estate on 16 January 1808 and is buried in Applebye's Chapel in Frederick's German Church in Copenhagen.

References

Further reading
 Hauch-Fausbøll, Th.: Af Slægten Browns Historie, 1918.

External links
 John Brown
 John Brown
 Source

1808 deaths
1723 births
18th-century Danish businesspeople
Danish Asiatic Company people
Danish businesspeople in shipping
Danish merchants
People from Dalkeith
Scottish emigrants to Denmark